The Chammliberg is a mountain of the Glarus Alps, located south of the Klausen Pass in the canton of Uri. While the south side of the mountain is covered by the large Hüfi Glacier, the north-west side consists of an 800 metre high face.

References

External links
Chammliberg on Hikr

Mountains of Switzerland
Mountains of the canton of Uri
Mountains of the Alps
Alpine three-thousanders